This is a list of aquaria (public aquariums). For dolphinariums, see List of dolphinariums. For zoos, see List of zoos. For a list of defunct zoos and aquariums, see List of former zoos and aquariums.

Aquariums are facilities where animals are confined within tanks and displayed to the public, and in which they may also be bred. Such facilities include public aquariums, oceanariums, marine mammal parks, and dolphinariums.

According to Vancouver Aquarium there are over 200 aquaria worldwide.

Africa

Egypt 
 Alexandria Aquarium
 Hurghada Grand Aquarium

Morocco 
 Morocco Mall Aquarium - Casablanca

Namibia 
 National Marine Aquarium of Namibia - Swakopmund

Réunion 
 Kélonia - Saint-Leu, Réunion

South Africa 
 Two Oceans Aquarium - Cape Town
 UShaka Marine World - Durban

Americas

Argentina
Mar del Plata Aquarium
Mundo Marino

The Bahamas 
 The Dig at Atlantis Paradise Island - Atlantis Paradise Island, Nassau

Bermuda
Bermuda Aquarium, Museum and Zoo

Brazil 
 Acqua Mundo
 Aquário de São Paulo
 Aquario de Ubatuba
 Aquário Municipal de Santos
 Aquário de Natal
 Aquário da Paraíba
 Oceanário de Aracajú
 Aquário de Bonito
 Aquário de Justino Malheiros
 Aquário de Aparecida do Norte
 Aquário de Guarapari
 Aquário de Peruíbe
 Aquário do Rio São Francisco
 Aquário do Zoo de Baurú
 Aquário do Zoo do Rio de Janeiro
 Aquário Municipal de Campinas
 Aquário Municipal de Iacanga
 Aquário Municipal de Piracicaba
 Mundo das Águas
 AquaRio
 Aquario Marinho de Paranaguá
 Aquário Municipal de Rômulo Martinelli

Canada 
List of aquaria in Canada

Colombia 
 Rodadero Sea Aquarium and Museum

Cuba 
Baconao Park
Freshwater Public Aquarium, Havana

French Antilles 
 Aquarium de la Guadeloupe - Gosier, Guadeloupe

Mexico 
 Acuario Inbursa - Mexico City
 Acuario Mazatlán - Mazatlán
 Acuario Michín - Puebla City
 Acuario Michin Guadalajara - Guadalajara
 Acuario de Veracruz - Veracruz
 Acuario del Zoológico de Guadalajara - Guadalajara

United States 
List of aquaria in the United States

Venezuela 
 Valencia's Aquarium (Acuario de Valencia)

Asia

China 
Beijing Underwater World - Beijing (1998) 
 Changfeng Ocean World (Sea Life Shanghai) - Shanghai (1999)
 Chimelong Ocean Kingdom - Hengqin, Zhuhai (2014)
 Cube Aquarium - Chengdu (2015)
Hangzhou Polar Ocean Park - Hangzhou (2008)
Hefei Oceanarium - Hefei (future)
Nanjing Underwater World - Nanjing (1996)
Polar Ocean World - Qingdao (2006)
Polar World - Dalian (2002)
Qingdao Underwater World and Qingdao Aquarium (1932) - Shandong
Shanghai Ocean Aquarium - Shanghai (2002)
Sun Asia Ocean World - Dalian (1994)

Hong Kong
 Ocean Park - Nam Long Shan, Hong Kong (1977)

India
List of aquaria in India

Indonesia
Sea World Indonesia - Jakarta
Jakarta Aquarium - Jakarta
Pangandaran Integrated Aquarium and Marine Research Institute - Pangandaran
BX OceaLife - Tangerang

Iran 
Anzali Aquarium - Gilan Province
Isfahan Aquarium - Isfahan Province
Kish Aquarium - Kish island
Tehran Aquarium - Jajrood, Tehran Province

Israel
 Coral World Underwater Observatory
 Israel aquarium

Japan 
List of aquaria in Japan

Kuwait 
Kuwait Scientific Center - Salmiyah, Kuwait City

Malaysia
Aquaria KLCC - Kuala Lumpur
Sea Life Malaysia - Legoland Malaysia Resort
The Green Connection - Kota Kinabalu, Sabah
Underwater World Langkawi - Cenang Beach, Langkawi Island

Pakistan
Clifton Fish Aquarium, Karachi

Philippines
Cebu Ocean Park - South Road Properties, Cebu City
Mactan Island Aquarium - Maribago, Lapu-Lapu
Malabon Zoo and Aquarium - Governor Pascual Street, Potrero, Malabon
Manila Ocean Park - Ermita, Manila
 Ocean Adventure - Subic, Zambales

Saudi Arabia
Fakieh Aquarium - Jeddah (2013)

Singapore
Marine Life Park - Sentosa
River Safari

South Korea 
 Aqua planet aquarium
 Aqua Planet 63 - Seoul
 Aqua Planet Ilsan - Goyang
 Aqua Planet Jeju - Jejudo
 Aqua Planet Yeosu - Yeosu
 Busan Aquarium - Busan
 COEX Aquarium - Seoul
 Lotte World Aquarium - Seoul
 Daejeon Aquaworld - Daejeon

Sri Lanka
 Water World - Kelaniya

Taiwan
National Museum of Marine Biology and Aquarium - Taiwan
Penghu Aquarium - Penghu
Yehliu Ocean World - New Taipei City
Farglory Ocean Park - Hualien County
Taoyuan Aquarium X PARK - Taoyuan, Taiwan

Thailand
Aquaria Phuket - Central Phuket, Phuket
Bangkok Aquarium - Department of Fisheries, Chatuchak, Bangkok
Bueng Boraphet Aquarium - Bueng Boraphet, Mueang Nakhon Sawan, Nakhon Sawan
Bueng Chawak Aquarium - Doem Bang Nang Buat, Suphanburi
Chaloem Phra Kiat Aquarium (Phichit) - Bueng Si Fai, Mueang Phichit, Phichit
Chaloem Phra Kiat Aquarium (Chanthaburi) - Tha Mai, Chanthaburi
Chiang Mai Zoo Aquarium - Chiang Mai Zoo, Chiang Mai
Institute of Marine Science of Burapha University - Burapha University, Bang Saen, Chonburi
Nong Khai Aquarium - Mueang Nong Khai, Nong Khai
Pa Sak Jolasid Dam Aquarium - Pa Sak Jolasid Dam, Phatthana Nikhom, Lop Buri
Phuket Aquarium - Phuket Zoo, Phuket
Rajamangala Trang Aquarium - Rajamangala University of Technology Srivijaya, Trang Campus, Pak Meng, Trang
Rayong Aquarium - Mueang Rayong, Rayong
Samut Sakhon Aquarium - Mueang Samut Sakhon, Samut Sakhon
Sea Life Bangkok Ocean World - Siam Paragon, Pathum Wan (Siam), Bangkok
Sisaket Aquarium - Mueang Si Sa Ket, Si Sa Ket
Underwater World Pattaya - Pattaya, Chonburi
Wang Pla Freshwater Aquarium of Bangsai Arts and Crafts Centre - Bang Sai Arts and Crafts Centre, Bang Sai, Phra Nakhon Si Ayutthaya

United Arab Emirates
Dubai Aquarium and Underwater Zoo - Dubai
The Lost Chambers - Dubai
Sharjah Aquarium - Sharjah

Vietnam
 Times City Vinpearl Aquarium
Tri Nguyen Aquarium, Nha Trang
Tuan Chau Aquarium, Ha Long Bay
Vinpearl Underwater World, Nha Trang

Europe

Austria 
 Haus des Meeres - Vienna

Belgium 
 Aquatopia - Antwerp
 Aquarium at the Antwerp Zoo - Antwerp
 Dubuisson Aquarium - Liège
 Sea Life Centre - Blankenberge

Bulgaria 
 Varna Aquarium

Croatia
 Akvarij Crikvenica (Aquarium Crikvenica) - Crikvenica
 Akvarij Dubrovnik, Instituta za more i priobalje (Dubrovnik Aquarium, Institute for Marine and Coastal Research) - Dubrovnik
 Slatkovodni akvarij Aquatika Karlovac (Freshwater Aquarium Aquatika Karlovac) - Karlovac
 Aquarium Pula (Aquarium Pula) - Pula

Cyprus
 Ocean Aquarium - Famagusta

Czech Republic
 Mořský svět - Prague
 Obří akvárium - Hradec Králové
 Rajské ostrovy - Děčín

Denmark 
 AQUA Akvarium & Dyrepark - Silkeborg
 Fisheries and Maritime Museum - Esbjerg
 Fjord & Bælt - Kerteminde
 Kattegatcentret - Grenå
 National Aquarium Denmark, Den Blå Planet (formerly Denmark's Aquarium) - Kastrup
 Nordsøen Oceanarium - Hirtshals
 Øresundsakvariet - Elsinore

Finland 
 Akvaariolinna, the Aquarium Castle - Petikko, Vantaa
 Kiela Naturium - Muonio, Lapland
 Maretarium - Kotka
 Sea Life Helsinki, near the Linnanmäki Amusement Park - Helsinki
 Särkänniemi Aquarium - Tampere

France 
 See also #French Antilles, #New Caledonia and #Réunion

 Aquarium de La Rochelle - La Rochelle (2001)
 Aquarium de Paris - Cinéaqua - Paris (opened in 1867 as "Aquarium du Trocadéro", closed in 1985, re-opened as "Cinéaqua" in 2006)
 Grand Aquarium de Touraine - between Amboise and Tours, on the southern bank of the river Loire
 Aquarium de Lyon - Lyon
 Aquarium du Musée de Zoologie - Nancy (1970)
 Aquarium Mare Nostrum Montpellier - Montpellier (2007)
 L'Aquashow - Audierne (2000)
 Centre de la Mer et des Eaux (closed 2010) - Paris
 Citadel of Besançon - Besançon
 Dorée Tropical Aquarium (Aquarium tropical de la Porte Dorée) - in Palais de la Porte Dorée, Paris (1931)
 La Cité de la mer - Cherbourg (2002)
 Great Aquarium Saint-Malo (1996)
 Le Musée de la mer - Biarritz (1933)
 Nausicaä Centre National de la Mer (French National Sea Experience Centre) - Boulogne-sur-Mer (1991)
 Océanopolis - Brest (1990)
 Océarium - Le Croisic (1992)
 Sea Life Centre Paris - Marne la Vallée (2001)
 Seaquarium Le Grau du Roi - Petite Camargue (1989)

Germany 
 Aquarium Berlin at the Berlin Zoological Garden - Berlin
 Aquazoo Löbbecke Museum - Düsseldorf
 Ozeaneum - Stralsund
 Sea Life Centre Berlin and AquaDom - Berlin
 Sea Life Centre Dresden - Dresden
 Sea Life Centre Hanover - Hanover
 Sea Life Centre Königswinter - Königswinter
 Sea Life Centre Konstanz - Konstanz
 Sea Life Centre Munich - Munich
 Sea Life Centre Nürnberg - Nürnberg
 Sea Life Centre Oberhausen - Oberhausen
 Sea Life Centre Speyer - Speyer
 Sea Life Centre Timmendorfer Strand - Timmendorfer Strand
 Tropen-Aquarium Hagenbeck at the Tierpark Hagenbeck - Hamburg

Greece
 Aquaworld Aquarium - Hersonissos, Crete  
 Cretaquarium - Crete

Hungary
 Tropicarium - Óceanárium - Budapest

Ireland 
 Dingle Oceanworld - Dingle
 Galway Atlantaquaria (National Aquarium of Ireland) - Galway
 Sea Life Bray - Bray

Italy 
 Alghero Aquarium - Alghero
 Acquario di Cala Gonone - Cala Gonone
 Aquarium of Cattolica, Cattolica
 Aquarium of Genoa - Genoa
 Aquarium of Leghorn - Leghorn
 Civic Aquarium of Milan - Milan
 Sea Life Gardaland, Gardaland, Lake Garda
 Stazione Zoologica di Napoli - Naples

Lithuania 
 Lithuanian Sea Museum, Klaipėda

Luxembourg 
 Wasserbillig Aquarium - Wasserbillig

Malta 
 Malta National Aquarium - Malta

Monaco 
 Oceanographic Museum and Aquarium - Monaco-Ville

The Netherlands 
 Aqua Zoo Friesland - Leeuwarden
 Burgers Zoo - Arnhem
 Diergaarde Blijdorp (Oceanium) - Rotterdam
 Dolfinarium Harderwijk - Harderwijk
 Sea Life Centre - Scheveningen

Norway 
 Atlanterhavsparken - Ålesund
 Bergen Aquarium - Bergen
 Polaria - Tromsø
 Risør Aquarium - Risør

Poland 
 Aquarium and Natural History Museum in Kraków - Kraków
 Aquarium in Kraków Zoo - Kraków
 Aquarium in Łódź - Łódź
 Aquarium in Warsaw Zoo - Warsaw
 Aquarium in Wroclaw Zoo - Wrocław
 Gdynia Aquarium - Gdynia
 Seal Sanctuary in Hel - Hel

Portugal 
 Aquário Vasco da Gama - Algés
 Mora Freshwater Aquarium/Fluviário de Mora - Mora, Portugal, Alentejo (100 km east of Lisbon), opened 2007
 Lisbon Oceanarium - Lisbon
 Sea Life Porto - Porto

Romania 
Constanța Aquarium - Constanţa (1958)
Acvariu Zoo Timișoara - Timișoara
Danube Delta's Aquarium - Tulcea

Russia 

 Akuliy Rif - Eisk (2007)
 Gelendzhik Oceanarium - Gelendzhik (2007)
 Moscow Oceanarium - Moscow (2015)
 Murmansk Oceanarium (ru) - Murmansk (1991)
 Oceanarium in Saint Petersburg (ru) - Saint Petersburg (2006)
 Primorsky Oceanarium (ru) - Vladivostok (2016)
 Sochi Discovery World (ru) - Sochi (2009)
 Vladivostok Oceanarium (ru) - Vladivostok (1991)
 Voronezh Oceanarium (ru) - Voronezh (2011)

Slovenia
 Akvarij - Terarij - Maribor
 Akvarij Piran - Piran

Spain 
 Aquarium Barcelona - Barcelona
 Aquarium Donostia-San Sebastián - San Sebastián
 Aquarium Finisterrae - A Coruña
 Aquarium Gijón - Gijón
 Aquarium Poema del Mar - Las Palmas
 Aquarium Seville - Seville
 Aquopolis La Pineda
 Barcelona Zoo - Barcelona
 Cosmocaixa- Barcelona
 L'Oceanogràfic at the Ciutat de les Arts i les Ciències - Valencia
 Palma Aquarium - Palma de Mallorca
 River Aquarium - Zaragoza
 Sea Life Benalmádena - Benalmádena, Málaga
 Zoo Aquarium de Madrid - Madrid

Sweden 
 Skansen Aquarium - Stockholm
 Stockholm Aquarium - Stockholm
 Universeum - Gothenburg
 Shipping Museum Aquarium - Gothenburg
 Havets Hus - Lysekil
 Tropicarium Kolmården - Kolmården Wildlife Park
 Malmö Museum Aquarium - Malmö

Turkey 
 Antalya Aquarium - Antalya
 Sea World (Deniz Dünyası) - Ankara
 Aqua Vega - Ankara
 Eti Underwater World (Eti Sualtı Dünyası) - Eskişehir
 İstanbul Aquarium - Istanbul
 Sea Life İstanbul (formerly TurkuaZoo) - Istanbul
 ViaSea Aquarium - Istanbul
 Emaar Aquarium & Underwater Zoo - Istanbul
 Aqua Diyarbakır - Diyarbakır
 Funtastic Aquarium İzmir - İzmir

Ukraine 
 Kyiv's Oceanarium Morskaya Skazka - Kyiv
 Nemo Public Aquarium - Odessa, Kharkiv, Donetsk

United Kingdom 
 Anglesey Sea Zoo - Isle of Anglesey, Wales
 Biota! - London, England (planned, but cancelled)
 Blackpool Tower Aquarium, Blackpool, England
 Blue Planet Aquarium - Ellesmere Port, England
 Blue Reef Aquarium - centres at Newquay, Portsmouth, Hastings, Bristol and Tynemouth in England
 Cannon Aquarium - Manchester, England
 Cornish Seal Sanctuary - Gweek, England
 The Deep - Kingston upon Hull, England
 Deep Sea World - North Queensferry, Scotland
 Exploris - Portaferry, Northern Ireland
 Hastings Underwater World - Hastings, England
 Horniman Museum Aquarium - London, England
 Hunstanton Sea Life Sanctuary - Hunstanton, England (part of the Sea Life Centres chain)
 Isle of Purbeck Aquarium - Wareham, Dorset, England
 Lake District Coast Aquarium - Maryport, Cumbria, England
 Lakes Aquarium - Lake District, England
 Macduff Aquarium - Macduff, Scotland
 National Marine Aquarium - Plymouth, England
 National Sea Life Centre - Birmingham, England (part of the Sea Life Centres chain)
 Natureland Seal Sanctuary, Skegness, Lincolnshire, England
 Oceanarium Bournemouth, - Bournemouth, England
 St Andrews Aquarium - St Andrews, Scotland
 Scottish Sea Life Sanctuary - Oban, Scotland (part of the Sea Life Centres chain)
 Sea Life Centres - Centres at Blackpool, Brighton, Great Yarmouth, Scarborough and Weymouth in England and Loch Lomond in Scotland
 Sea Life London Aquarium - London, England
 Sea Life Manchester Aquarium - Manchester, England
 Sealife Adventure - Southend, England
 SeaQuarium - Rhyl, Wales
 SeaQuarium - Weston-super-Mare, England
Skegness Aquarium

Oceania/Australia

Australia
List of aquaria in Australia

Guam
 Underwater World - Tumon

New Caledonia
 Aquarium des Lagons - Nouméa

New Zealand
 Kelly Tarlton's Sea Life Aquarium - Auckland
 Marineland - Napier
 National Aquarium of New Zealand - Napier
 Southern Encounter Aquarium and Kiwi House - Christchurch

Palau
 Palau International Coral Reef Center - Koror

See also 

 List of AZA member zoos and aquariums
 List of botanical gardens
 List of CAZA member zoos and aquariums
 List of dolphinariums
 List of largest aquaria
 List of tourist attractions worldwide
 List of zoos

References

External links 

 A project to map all the public aquariums in the world
 List of all public aquaria in Europe
 Norfolk, Howard. My Visit to the Freshwater Public Aquarium in Havana, Cuba, Aquarticles.com, January 2004, retrieved on: June 22, 2007
 Public Aquaria, Fins: The Fish Information Service, Actwin.com, 2000, retrieved on: June 22, 2007
 A guide to public aquaria in the world

 
Aquaria